Shi Qinglan is a Chinese cross-country mountain biker. At the 2012 Summer Olympics, she competed in the Women's cross-country at Hadleigh Farm, finishing in 12th place.

References

Chinese mountain bikers
Chinese female cyclists
Living people
Olympic cyclists of China
Cyclists at the 2012 Summer Olympics
Asian Games medalists in cycling
Cyclists at the 2010 Asian Games
Cyclists at the 2014 Asian Games
Medalists at the 2010 Asian Games
Medalists at the 2014 Asian Games
Asian Games gold medalists for China
Asian Games silver medalists for China

1986 births
People from Dali
Cyclists from Yunnan
21st-century Chinese women